This is a list of the ordinances issued by President of Bangladesh.

1971 
The Bangladesh (Collection of Taxes) Order, 1971 (Acting President's Order)
The Bangladesh (Administration of Banks) Order, 1971 (Acting President's Order)

1972 
The Bangladesh (Taking Over of Control and Management of Industrial and Commercial Concerns) Order, 1972 (Acting President's Order)
The Bangladesh (Administration of Financial Institutions) Order, 1972 (A.P.O.)
The Bangladesh Law Officers Order, 1972 (President's Order) Bangladesh Collaborators (Special Tribunals) Order, 1972
The Bangladesh Shipping Corporation Order, 1972 (President's Order) [Repealed]
The Bangladesh (Legal Proceedings) Order, 1972 (President's Order)
The Bangladesh Abandoned Property (Control, Management and Disposal) Order, 1972 (President's Order) 
The Bangladesh (Adaptation of Insurance Act) Order, 1972 (President's Order)
The Bangladesh Bank (Demonetisation of Currency Notes) Order, 1972 (President's Order)
The Bangladesh Constituent Assembly Members (Cessation of Membership) Order, 1972 (P.O.)
The Bangladesh Banks (Nationalisation) Order, 1972 (President's Order)
The Bangladesh Industrial Enterprises (Nationalisation) Order, 1972 (President's Order) [Repealed]
The Bangladesh Inland Water Transport Corporation Order, 1972 (President's Order)
The Bangladesh (Vesting of Property and Assets) Order, 1972 (President's Order)
The Bangladesh Insurance (Emergency Provisions) Order, 1972 (President's Order)
The Bangladesh (Resumption of Easement Lands) Order, 1972 (President's Order)
The Bangladesh (Adaptation of East Pakistan Intermediate and Secondary Education Ordinance) Order, 1972 (President's Order)
The Bangladesh Industrial Development Corporation Order, 1972 (President's Order)
The East Pakistan Madrasah Education Ordinance (Repeal) Order, 1972 (President's Order)
The Bangladesh Names and Emblems (Prevention of Unauthorised Use) Order, 1972 (President's Order) 
The Bangladesh Legal Practitioner's and Bar Council Order, 1972 (President's Order)
The Bangladesh (Adaptation of Existing Laws) Order, 1972 (President's Order)
The Bangladesh Special (Remuneration and Privileges) Order, 1972 (President's Order)
The Finance (1971-1972) Order, 1972 (President's Order)
The Bangladesh Nationalised Enterprises and Statutory Corporation (Prohibition of Strikes and Unfair Labour Practices) Order, 1972 (President's Order)
The Bangladesh Power Development Boards Order, 1972 (President's Order)
The Bangladesh (Demonetisation of Bank Notes) Order, 1972 (President's Order)
The Bangladesh Taxation Laws (Adaptation) Order, 1972 (President's Order)
The Bangladesh College of Physicians and Surgeons Order, 1972 (President's Order) [Repealed]
The Bangladesh (Whips) Order, 1972 (President's Order)
The Trading Corporation of Bangladesh Order, 1972 (President's Order)
The Bangladesh (Legal Proceedings) (Second) Order, 1972 (President's Order)
The Census Order, 1972 (President's Order)
The Government Educational and Training Institutions (Adaptation) Order, 1972 (President's Order)
The Bangladesh (Budgetary Provisions) Order, 1972 (President's Order)
The National Board of Revenue Order, 1972 (President's Order)
The Finance Order, 1972 (President's Order)
The Printing Corporation (Vesting) Order, 1972 (President's Order)
The Bangladesh Coinage Order, 1972 (President's Order)
The Bangladesh Currency Order, 1972 (President's Order)
The International Financial Organisations Order, 1972 (President's Order)
The Bangladesh (Legal Proceedings) (Third) Order, 1972 (President's Order)
The Bangladesh (Freedom Fighters) Welfare Trust Order, 1972 (President's Order) [Repealed]
The Bangladesh Insurance (Nationalisation) Order, 1972 (President's Order)
The Bangladesh Land Holding (Limitation) Order, 1972 (President's Order)
The Bangladesh Scouts Order, 1972 (President's Order)
The Pakistan Television Corporation (Taking Over) Order, 1972 (President's Order)
The Bangladesh Committee of Management (Temporary Arrangement) Order, 1972 (P.O.)
The Bangladesh Bank Order, 1972 (President's Order)
The Bangladesh Shilpa Rin Sangstha Order, 1972 (President's Order)
The Bangladesh Shilpa Bank Order, 1972 (President's Order)
The Bangladesh National Anthem, Flag and Emblem Order, 1972 (President's Order)
The Bangladesh Industrial Development Corporation (Dissolution) Order, 1972 (President's Order)
The Bangladesh Transfer of Immovable Property (Temporary Provisions) Order, 1972 (President's Order)
The Bangladesh Parjatan Corporation Order, 1972 (President's Order)
The Bangladesh Rifles Order, 1972 (President's Order) [Repealed]
The Bangladesh Citizenship (Temporary Provisions) Order, 1972 (President's Order)
The Representation of the People Order, 1972 (President's Order)
The Bangladesh Insurance Corporation (Dissolution) Order, 1972 (President's Order)
The Bangladesh (Adaptation of University Laws) Ordinance, 1972

1973 
The Bangladesh Chartered Accountants Order, 1973 (President's Order)
The Asian Development Bank Order, 1973 (President's Order)
The Bangladesh House Building Finance Corporation Order, 1973 (President's Order)
The Bangladesh Passport Order, 1973 (President's Order)
The University Grants Commission of Bangladesh Order, 1973 (President's Order) 
The Dhaka University Order, 1973 (President's Order)
The Bangladesh Laws (Repealing and Amending) Order, 1973 (President's Order)
The Bangladesh Atomic Energy Commission Order, 1973 (President's Order)
The Bangladesh National Liberation Struggle (Indemnity) Order, 1973 (President's Order)
The Trade Marks (Invalidation and Summary Registration) Order, 1973 (President's Order)
The Bangladesh Wild Life (Preservation) Order, 1973 (President's Order) [Repealed]
The Bangladesh Red Crescent Society Order, 1973 (President's Order) 
The Bangladesh Krishi Bank Order, 1973 (President's Order)
The Members of Parliament (Remuneration and Allowances) Order, 1973 (President's Order)

1975 
The Jute Companies (Acquisition of Shares) Ordinance, 1975
The Government of Bangladesh (Services) (Repeal) Ordinance, 1975
The District Administration (Repeal) Ordinance, 1975
The Government Servants (Review of Penalties) Ordinance, 1975
The Gandhi Ashram (Board of Trustees) Ordinance, 1975 [Repealed]
The Jatiya Rakkhi Bahini (Absorption in the Army) Ordinance, 1975
The Bidi Manufacture (Prohibition) Ordinance, 1975
The Bangladesh Government Hats and Bazars (Management) (Repeal) Ordinance, 1975
The Registration (Extension of Limitation) Ordinance, 1975
The Universities Laws Amendment Ordinance, 1975
The Bangladesh Collaborators (Special Tribunals) (Repeal) Ordinance, 1975
Indemnity Ordinance, 1975

1976 
The International Finance Corporation Ordinance, 1976 [Repealed]
The Pharmacy Ordinance, 1976 
The Delimitation of Constituencies Ordinance, 1976 [Repealed]
The Statutory Corporations (Delegation of Powers) (Repeal) Ordinance, 1976
The Alienation of Land (Distressed Circumstances) (Restoration) Ordinance, 1976
The Supreme Court Judges (Travelling Allowances) Ordinance, 1976 [Repealed]
The Investment Corporation of Bangladesh Ordinance, 1976 [Repealed]
The Land Development Tax Ordinance, 1976
The Appropriation Ordinance, 1976
The Appropriation (Railways) Ordinance, 1976
The Finance Ordinance, 1976
The Appropriation (Supplementary) Ordinance, 1976
The Railway Nirapatta Bahini Ordinance, 1976 [Repealed]
The Bangladesh Jute Corporation (Repeal) Ordinance, 1976
The Newspapers (Annulment of Declaration) (Repeal) Ordinance, 1976
The Dhaka Metropolitan Police Ordinance, 1976
The Chittagong Port Authority Ordinance, 1976
The Mongla Port Authority Ordinance, 1976
The Public Servants (Marriage with Foreign Nationals) Ordinance, 1976 [Repealed]
The Bangladesh Agricultural Research Institute Ordinance, 1976 [Repealed]
The Inland Shipping Ordinance, 1976
The Bangladesh Shishu Academy Ordinance, 1976 [Repealed]
The Chittagong Hill Tracts Development Board Ordinance, 1976 [Repealed]
The Rajshahi Town Development Authority Ordinance, 1976 [Repealed]
The Police Officers (Special Provisions) Ordinance, 1976
The Bangladesh Rifles (Special Provisions) Ordinance, 1976 [Repealed]
The Bangabandhu National Agriculture Award Fund Ordinance, 1976
The Bangladesh Petroleum Corporation Ordinance, 1976 [Repealed]
The Chittagong Division Development Board Ordinance, 1976
The Vested and Non-Resident Property (Administration) (Repeal) Ordinance, 1976

1977 
The Bangladesh Malaria Eradication Board (Repeal) Ordinance, 1977 [Repealed]
The Government of Bangladesh (Services Screening) (Repeal) Ordinance, 1977
The Bangladesh Biman Corporation Ordinance, 1977
The Appropriation Ordinance, 1977 The Appropriation (Supplementary) Ordinance, 1977
The Finance Ordinance, 1977
The Appropriation (Railways) Ordinance, 1977
The Appropriation (Railways Supplementary) Ordinance, 1977
The Paurashava Ordinance, 1977 (Ordinance) [Repealed]
The Minimum Wages (Fixation) (Repeal) Ordinance, 1977
The Seeds Ordinance, 1977 [Repealed]
The Tea Ordinance, 1977 [Repealed]
The Regulation of Salary of Employees Laws Repeal Ordinance, 1977
The Export Promotion Bureau Ordinance, 1977 [Repealed]
The Bangladesh Travel Agencies (Registration and Control) Ordinance, 1977 [Repealed]
The Housing and Building Research Institute Ordinance, 1977
The Rural Electrification Board Ordinance, 1977 [Repealed]
The Cost and Management Accountants Ordinance, 1977 [Repealed]
The Bangladesh Public Service Commission Ordinance, 1977
The Financial Institutions Laws Amendment Ordinance, 1977
The Bangladesh Sericulture Board Ordinance, 1977 [Repealed]
The Bangladesh Handloom Board Ordinance, 1977 [Repealed]

1978 
The Government Servants (Review of Penalties) (Dissolution of Review Board) Ordinance, 1978
The Prevention of Malaria (Special Provisions) Ordinance, 1978 [Repealed]
The Bangladesh Council of Scientific and Industrial Research Ordinance, 1978 [Repealed]
The Madrasah Education Ordinance, 1978 [Repealed]
The Supreme Court Judges (Remuneration and Privileges) Ordinance, 1978 [Repealed]
The Defence Services Laws Amendment Ordinance, 1978 [Repealed]
The Bangla Academy Ordinance, 1978 [Repealed]
The Finance Ordinance, 1978
The Appropriation (Railways Supplementary) Ordinance, 1978
The Appropriation (Railways) Ordinance, 1978
The Appropriation (Supplementary) Ordinance, 1978
The Appropriation Ordinance, 1978
The Asian Reinsurance Corporation Ordinance, 1978 [Repealed]
The Political Parties Ordinance, 1978
The Foreign Donations (Voluntary Activities) Regulation Ordinance, 1978 [Repealed]
The Chittagong Metropolitan Police Ordinance, 1978
The Law Reforms Ordinance, 1978
The International Centre for Diarrhoeal Disease Research, Bangladesh, Ordinance, 1978

1979 
The Government Servants (Special Provisions) Ordinance, 1979 [Repealed]
The Bangladesh Telegraph and Telephone Board Ordinance, 1979
The Railway Property (Unlawful Possession) Ordinance, 1979 [Repealed]
The President's Pension Ordinance, 1979 [Repealed]
The Bangladesh Sangbad Sangstha Ordinance, 1979 [Repealed]
The Leader and Deputy Leader of the Opposition (Remuneration and Privileges) Ordinance, 1979 [Repealed]
The Defence Services (Supreme Command) Ordinance, 1979 [Repealed]
The Armed Police Battalions Ordinance, 1979

1982 
The Acquisition and Requisition of Immovable Property Ordinance, 1982 [Repealed]
The Medical Practice and Private Clinics and Laboratories (Regulation) Ordinance, 1982
The Bangladesh Abandoned Children (Special Provisions) (Repeal) Ordinacne, 1982
The Zakat Fund Ordinance, 1982
The Drugs (Control) Ordinance, 1982
The Standards of Weights and Measures Ordinance, 1982 [Repealed]
The Bangladesh Flag Vessels (Protection) Ordinance, 1982 [Repealed]
The Finance Ordinance, 1982
The Supreme Court Judges (Leave, Pension and Privileges) Ordinance, 1982
The Emigration Ordinance, 1982 [Repealed]
The Bangladesh Veterinary Practitioners Ordinance, 1982 [Repealed]
The Foreign Contributions (Regulation) Ordinance, 1982 [Repealed]
The Attia Forest (Protection) Ordinance, 1982
The Public Employees Discipline (Punctual Attendance) Ordinance, 1982 [Repealed]
The Chittagong City Corporation Ordinance, 1982 [Repealed]
The Haor Development Board (Dissolution) Ordinance, 1982
The Off-shore Islands Development Board (Dissolution) Ordinance, 1982
The Institute of Islamic Education and Research (Repeal) Ordinance, 1982
The Bangladesh Hotels and Restaurants Ordinance, 1982 [Repealed]
The Bangladesh Rural Development Board Ordinance, 1982 [Repealed]
The Electoral Rolls Ordinance, 1982 [Repealed]

1983 
The Fish and Fish Products (Inspection and Quality Control) Ordinance, 1983 [Repealed]
The Bangladesh Railway Board (Repeal) Ordinance, 1983
The Bangladesh Merchant Shipping Ordinance, 1983
The Finance Ordinance, 1983
The Bangladesh Irrigation Water Rate Ordinance, 1983
The Bangladesh Unani and Ayurvedic Practitioners Ordinance, 1983
The Marine Fisheries Ordinance, 1983 [Repealed]
The National Archives Ordinance, 1983 [Repealed]
The Dhaka City Corporation Ordinance, 1983 [Repealed]
The Bangladesh Homoeopathic Practitioners Ordinance, 1983
The Primary Education (Repeal) Ordinance, 1983
The Grameen Bank Ordinance, 1983 [Repealed]
The Local Government (Union Parishads) Ordinance, 1983 [Repealed]
The Bangladesh Jatiya Jadughar Ordinance, 1983
The Motor Vehicles Ordinance, 1983 [Repealed]
The Chief Election Commissioner and Election Commissioners (Remuneration and Privileges) Ordinance, 1983
The National Curriculum and Text-Book Board Ordinance, 1983 [Repealed]
The Bangladesh Krira Shikkha Protishtan Ordinance, 1983 [Repealed]
The Bangladesh Nursing Council Ordinance, 1983
The Santosh Islamic University (Board of Trustees) Ordinance, 1983 
The Hindu Religious Welfare Trust Ordinance, 1983 [Repealed]
The Buddhist Religious Welfare Trust Ordinance, 1983 [Repealed]
The Christian Religious Welfare Trust Ordin ince, 1983 [Repealed] 
The Foreign Voluntary Organisations (Acquisition of Immovable Property) Regulation Ordinance, 1983

1984 
The Bangladesh Institute of Nuclear Agriculture Ordinance, 1984 (Ordinance) [Repealed]
The Land Reforms Ordinance, 1984 
The Agricultural Labour (Minimum Wages) Ordinance, 1984
The Bangladesh Public Administration Training Centre Ordinance, 1984 [Repealed]
The Bangladesh Institute of International and Strategic Studies Ordinance, 1984 [Repealed]
The Livestock Research Institute Ordinance, 1984 [Repealed]
The Industrial Relations (Regulation) (Repeal) Ordinance, 1984
The Breast-Milk Substitutes (Regulation of Marketing) Ordinance, 1984 [Repealed]
The Income-tax Ordinance, 1984
The Bangladesh Women's Rehabilitation and Welfare Foundation (Repeal) Ordinance, 1984
The Nazrul Institute Ordinance, 1984 [Repealed]
The Finance Ordinance, 1984 
The Fisheries Research Institute Ordinance, 1984 [Repealed]
The Districts (Extension to the Chittagong Hill-tracts) Ordinance, 1984
The Khulna City Corporation Ordinance, 1984 [Repealed]

1985 
The Public Servants (Dismissal on Conviction) Ordinance, 1985 [Repealed]
The Ghousul Azam Abdul Qader Jillani Mosque Trust (Repeal) Ordinance, 1985
The Family Courts Ordinance, 1985 
The Bangladesh Oil, Gas and Mineral Corporation Ordinance, 1985
The Surplus Public Servants Absorption Ordinance, 1985 [Repealed]
The Government Primary School Teachers Welfare Trust Ordinance, 1985
The Ground Water Management Ordinance, 1985 [Repealed]
The Finance Ordinance, 1985 
Bangladesh Bridge Authority Ordinance, 1985 [Repealed]
The Bangladesh Standards and Testing Institution Ordinance, 1985 [Repealed]
The Civil Aviation Authority Ordinance, 1985 [Repealed]
The Youth Welfare Fund Ordinance, 1985 [Repealed] The Khulna Metropolitan Police Ordinance, 1985
The Abandoned Buildings (Supplementary Provisions) Ordinance, 1985

1986 
The Chittagong Shahi Jame Masjid Ordinance, 1986
The Official Vehicles (Regulation of Use) Ordinance, 1986 [Repealed]
The Drugs (Supplementary Provisions) Ordinance, 1986 
The Police (Non-Gazetted Employees) Welfare Fund Ordinance, 1986
The Special Security Force Ordinance, 1986 [Repealed]
The Finance Ordinance, 1986 
The Development Board Laws (Repeal) Ordinance, 1986
The Public Corporations (Management Co-ordination) Ordinance, 1986
The Rajshahi Krishi Unnayan Bank Ordinance, 1986 [Repealed]
The Bangladesh Cha Sramik Kallyan Fund Ordinance, 1986 [Repealed]
The Bangladesh Academy for Rural Development Ordinance, 1986 [Repealed]

2020 
 Suppression of Violence against Women and Children (Amendment) Ordinance, 2000

2023 
 Bangladesh Energy Regulatory Commission (Amendment) Ordinance, 2022

See also 
List of Acts of the Jatiya Sangsad

References 

Presidents of Bangladesh
Ordinances
Law of Bangladesh
Bangladesh